The Tauglboden Formation is a geologic formation in Salzburg, Austria. It preserves fossils dating back to the Oxfordian stage of the Jurassic period. The radiolarites were deposited in a deep marine environment.

Fossil content 
The following fossils were reported from the formation:
Radiolarians
 Nassellaria
 Dibolachras chandrika
 Mirifusus guadalupensis
 M. mediodilatatus
 Podocapsa amphitreptera
 Spongocapsula palmerae
 Podobursa sp. 
 Polycystina
 Homoeoparonaella argolidensis
 H. elegans
 Orbiculiforma mclaughlini
 Tritrabs casmaliensis
 T. ewingi
 T. exotica
 Patulibracchium cf. californiaensis
 Pentasphaera sp.

See also 
 List of fossiliferous stratigraphic units in Austria
 Ruhpolding Formation

References

Bibliography 
 

Geologic formations of Austria
Jurassic System of Europe
Jurassic Austria
Oxfordian Stage
Deep marine deposits
Paleontology in Austria
Northern Limestone Alps